The Isle of Pingo Pongo is a 1938 Merrie Melodies cartoon supervised by Tex Avery. The short was released on May 28, 1938 and features an early version of Elmer Fudd. This is the first of a series of travelogue spoofs, and the first Warner Bros. "spot gag" cartoon, where each vignette is punctuated by a moment of blackout.

Plot
The short follows a cruise ship's trip from New York to the island, presumably located in the South Seas. The ship sails past the Statue of Liberty, who acts as a traffic cop, past the "Canary Islands" and "Sandwich Islands".

The cartoon revolves around themes of jazz and primitivism, and is set on a remote island. The central character is an early version of Elmer Fudd known as Elmer, and most of the cartoon consists of travelogue-type narration and blackout gags, many including Elmer. The inhabitants of Pingo-Pongo are mostly tall, black, and have big feet and lips. Like other cartoons at this time, the native inhabitants resemble animals and reflect stereotypes of the time. The natives are at first playing drums, then break into a jazz beat, still described as a "primitive savage rhythm," which leads the audience to connect the savage jungle to modern jazz music.

There is a running gag with the Elmer where he says, "Now Boss?", but the narrator keeps saying "Not now." That is, until the end, where the sun fails to set when he says "as the sun sinks slowly into the West". Elmer reappears and says "Now Boss?" The boss says "Yeah, now!" Elmer shoots the sun, making it sink into the West and ending the film.

Reception
Motion Picture Herald printed a letter from an exhibitor in their "What the Picture Did For Me" section: "These Merrie Melodies are as good as the Walt Disney stuff."

References

External links
 
 
 The Isle of Pingo Pongo (Blue Ribbon) on the Internet Archive

1938 films
1938 animated films
1938 short films
Censored Eleven
Merrie Melodies short films
Warner Bros. Cartoons animated short films
Films about race and ethnicity
Films directed by Tex Avery
Films set in Oceania
Films set on islands
1930s Warner Bros. animated short films
Elmer Fudd films
1930s English-language films